Devil's Fork, Devils Fork and Devil Fork can refer to:

The blivet, also known as the Devil's tuning fork, an optical illusion
Devils Fork State Park, a  park in Northwestern South Carolina
Bidens frondosa, an herb native to North America
The Devils Fork, a tributary of the Little Red River in Arkansas
Devil Fork, Kentucky
Devils Fork, West Virginia